Leah Thomas, also known as Green Girl Leah, is an American environmental activist active on Instagram whose work focuses on the application of intersectionality to environmental justice.

She gained notoriety after an Instagram post of hers that used the phrase "intersectional environmentalism" and called for environmental activists to support Black Lives Matter in the wake of the murder of George Floyd. She runs Intersectional Environmentalist, a website targeted towards people interested in the relationship between the environment and social justice. She is the author of The Intersectional Environmentalist: How to Dismantle Systems of Oppression to Protect People + Planet, which provides advice to environmental activists and describes theories of relationships between race, privilege, social justice, and the environment.

Thomas advocates for climate change activists to adopt anti-racist approaches in order to facilitate an intersectional environmental movement.

External links 

 Personal website
 Instagram page

References 

American environmentalists
Social media influencers
African-American activists
African-American feminists
Ecofeminists
American women environmentalists
Living people
Year of birth missing (living people)
Environmental justice